Thomas Assheton Smith may refer to:

 Thomas Assheton Smith (1752–1828), English landowner and sportsman
 Thomas Assheton Smith (1776–1858), his son, English landowner and sportsman